North Creake is a village and civil parish in the north west of the English county of Norfolk.
For the purposes of local government, it falls within the district of King's Lynn and West Norfolk. The parish shares boundaries with the adjacent parishes of Burnham Market, Burnham Thorpe, Holkham, Walsingham, South Creake, Barwick and Stanhoe.

The village lies on the River Burn, which flows through the centre of the village.  to the north of the village along the river lies the ruined Creake Abbey. The village itself has a church, a public house and a post office. Most of the agricultural land surrounding the village, and many of the village houses, today belong to the estate of the Earl Spencer, although his family seat is many miles away in Althorp, Northamptonshire.

On 27 April 1944, a de Havilland Mosquito fighter bomber on a night training exercise crashed in the centre of the village, killing the crew of two. On the 60th anniversary of the crash in 2004, a plaque on the approximate location of the crash was unveiled by a Royal Air Force guard of honour and other dignitaries, including relatives and friends of those killed.

The village was struck by an F1/T3 tornado on 23 November 1981, as part of the record-breaking nationwide tornado outbreak on that day.

The derivation of the name "Creake" is apparently from the Celtic word "creic" meaning a rock. South Creake is recorded in the  Domesday Book of 1086 as "Suthcreich".

See also
RAF North Creake Second World War airfield

References

External links

Photographs of North & South Creake
Norfolkcoast.co.uk on North Creake
Information from Genuki Norfolk on North Creake

Villages in Norfolk
King's Lynn and West Norfolk
Civil parishes in Norfolk